Brittleton is a surname. Notable people with the surname include:

English professional footballers 
John Brittleton (1906–1982), played for Aston Villa F.C. and son of Tom Brittleton
Sam Brittleton (1885–1951), brother of Tom Brittleton
Tom Brittleton (1882–1955), played mostly for Sheffield Wednesday F.C.